A list of films produced in Hong Kong in 1997.

1997

Notes

External links
IMDB list of Hong Kong films
Hong Kong films of 1997 at HKcinemamagic.com

1997
Lists of 1997 films by country or language
1997 in Hong Kong